Vernon Hill (born 1945) is an American businessman and bank executive.

Vernon Hill may also refer to:

 Vernon Hill (cricketer, born 1871) (1871–1932), Welsh-born English cricketer
 Vernon Hill (cricketer, born 1978), English cricketer
 Vernon Hill (sculptor) (1882–1972), English sculptor
 Vernon Hill, Virginia, unincorporated community in Halifax County, Virginia, United States

See also 
 Vernon Hills, Illinois, suburb of Chicago in Lake County, Illinois, United States
 Vernon Hills High School, school located in Vernon Hills, Illinois
 Vernon Hills station, station on Metra's North Central Service in Vernon Hills, Illinois
 Hill (surname)